The CONCACAF Gold Cup is an association football  competition for men's national football teams in North America, Central America, and the Caribbean, governed by CONCACAF. The tournament is held every two years and is used to determine the continental champion; previously, the winner of the competition would also qualify for the now-defunct FIFA Club World Cup.

The Gold Cup was established in 1991 as the successor to the CONCACAF Championship and has been hosted primarily in the United States. Various tournaments have had eight to sixteen teams, including guest teams from outside the confederation. Each edition begins with a round-robin group stage and culminates in a single-elimination knockout stage. Mexico is the most successful team in the tournament's history, having won eight times, followed by the United States with seven titles and Canada with one.

List of finals

 The "Year" column refers to the year the CONCACAF Gold Cup was held, and wikilinks to the article about that tournament.
 Links in the "Winners" and "Runners-up" columns point to the articles for the national football teams of the countries, not the articles for the countries.
 The wikilinks in the "Final score" column point to the article about that tournament's final game.

Results by nation

References